Titeuf is a French 3D animated family and comedy film directed by Zep, based on his Titeuf comic books. The film was released on April 6, 2011.

Cast
 Donald Reignoux as Titeuf / Hugo
 Nathalie Homs as Manu / Zizie
 Vincent Ropion as François
 Maria Pacôme as Grandma
 Jean Rochefort as Grandpa
 Zabou Breitman as Titeuf's mother
 Mélanie Bernier as Nadia
 Michael Lonsdale as the psychologist
 Sam Karmann as Titeuf's father
 Johnny Hallyday as the old adventurer on the train

Release
The film premiered in France on 6 April 2011 through Pathé Distribution, who launched it in 622 theatres. It topped the French box-office chart the first week, with a weekend gross of 2,124,514 euro.

Video game
A video game, Titeuf, le Film, consisting of mini-games, was released on March 31, 2011. The game was developed by Deep Silver Type and published by Tate Interactive & Deep Silver for the Nintendo DS, Wii and PC.

References

External links
 Official website 
 

2011 animated films
2011 films
2011 3D films
2010s French animated films
Animated comedy films
Belgian animated films
2010s children's comedy films
Films based on French comics
French 3D films
Pathé films
2010s French-language films
2010s children's animated films
3D animated films
2011 comedy films
Animated films based on animated series
Swiss animated films
French-language Swiss films
French-language Belgian films